Igor Nikulin (born August 26, 1972) is a Russian former professional ice hockey right winger who played in one National Hockey League game for the Mighty Ducks of Anaheim during the 1997 Stanley Cup playoffs. The rest of his career, which lasted from 1992 to 2004, was split between Russia and the North American minor leagues.

Career statistics

See also
List of players who played only one game in the NHL

External links

1972 births
Ak Bars Kazan players
Anaheim Ducks draft picks
Baltimore Bandits players
Cincinnati Mighty Ducks players
Fort Wayne Komets players
HC Neftekhimik Nizhnekamsk players
Krylya Sovetov Moscow players
Living people
Molot-Prikamye Perm players
Mighty Ducks of Anaheim players
People from Cherepovets
Russian ice hockey right wingers
Severstal Cherepovets players
SKA Saint Petersburg players
Sportspeople from Vologda Oblast